Robert Barton (born 1 January 1970) is a British actor who has appeared as minor characters in a few TV series and films.

Filmography

References
 

1970 births
British male film actors
British male television actors
Living people
Place of birth missing (living people)